Mons is a 1926 British silent war film directed by Walter Summers. It reconstructs the 1914 Battle of Mons during the First World War. Such reconstruction films were popular during the decade, and Summers had previously made the similar Ypres the previous year.

References

Bibliography
 Alan Burton & Steve Chibnall. Historical Dictionary of British Cinema. Scarecrow Press, 2013.

External links

1926 films
British war films
British silent feature films
1926 war films
1920s English-language films
Films directed by Walter Summers
British World War I films
British black-and-white films
1920s British films